The Province-class fast attack craft, also known as the Dhofar class, is a British-built series of missile-armed fast attack craft for the Royal Navy of Oman.

Design
The Province class was designed and built by the British shipyard Vosper Thornycroft based on their  which they had built for the Egyptian Navy. The first ship of the class, Dhofar was ordered in 1980, with further ships (with slightly modified armament and equipment) ordered in 1981 and 1986.

Displacement is  light and  full load.

The ships' main anti-ship armament is the Exocet anti-ship missile. Dhofar can carry six MM-40 Exocets missiles, while the other three ships of the class can carry eight MM-40s, in two quadruple mounts. An OTO Melara 76 mm gun is mounted forwards, while a twin Breda Bofors 40 mm gun is mounted aft. In addition, two 12.7 mm (.50 inch) machine guns are fitted.

Ships in class

Citations

References

Missile boat classes